Dublin Review may refer to:
Dublin Review (Catholic periodical), published in London 1836–1969
The Dublin Review, a literary magazine published in Dublin since 2000

See also
Dublin Review of Books